The R526 is a regional road in County Limerick, Ireland which follows the former route of the N20 that is now classified as the M20 Motorway, from Junction 5 of the M20 to a junction with the R445 in Limerick city centre.

References 

 Roads Act 1993 (Classification of Regional Roads) Order 2006 – Department of Transport

Regional roads in the Republic of Ireland
Roads in County Limerick